Ron Cooper may refer to:
 Ron Cooper (artist) (born 1943), American artist
 Ron Cooper (American football) (born 1962), American football coach
 Ron Cooper (Australian footballer) (1911–1991), Australian footballer for Carlton and North Melbourne
 Ron Cooper (bicycle framebuilder) (1932–2012), British bicycle builder
 Ron Cooper (boxer) (1928–2023), British Olympic boxer
 Ron Cooper (English footballer) (1938–2018), English footballer for Peterborough
 Ronald Cooper (born 1958), former NASCAR driver